Rząśnik may refer to the following places in Poland:
Rząśnik, Lower Silesian Voivodeship (south-west Poland)
Rząśnik, Ostrów Mazowiecka County in Masovian Voivodeship (east-central Poland)
Rząśnik, Wyszków County in Masovian Voivodeship (east-central Poland)